Jarosław Lindenberg (born 9 November 1956 in Warsaw) is a Polish diplomat and philosopher, ambassador to Latvia (1992–1997), Bulgaria (1998–2003), Montenegro (2007–2011), and Bosnia and Herzegdovina (since 2018).

Life 
Lindenberg graduated from Faculty of Philosophy of the University of Warsaw. In 1985, he defended his PhD thesis on philosophy of history by Bolesław Limanowski.

Since the late 1970s, he was engaged in Polish dissident movement, for instance, he was editor of the samizdat magazine "Jaruzela"; he was cooperating with Jacek Czaputowicz at that time. He was member of the Club of Catholic Intelligentsia. He was an internee during the martial law in 1981–1982.

Between 1980 and 1986, he worked at Branch of the University of Warsaw in Białystok. For the next five years he was a lecturer at the Academy of Special Education in Warsaw. In the 1980s, he was also, occasionally, writing scenarios and co-authoring novels.

In 1990, he joined the Polish Ministry of Foreign Affairs, starting at the minister cabinet. In 1991, he was responsible for opening Polish embassies in Riga, Latvia and Tallinn, Estonia, heading them as chargé d'affaires. From 1992 to 1997, he was ambassador to Latvia, until 1994 accredited to Estonia as well. From 1997 he was working at the MFA Department of Promotion and Information. In 1998, Lindenberg became ambassador to Bulgaria, ending his term in 2003. For the next four years he worked at the MFA European Department and Director General's Office. Between 2007 and 2011, he was chargé d'affaires and ambassador to newly opened embassy in Podgorica, Montenegro. From 2011 to 2018, he was deputy director of the Diplomatic Protocol. In August 2018, he was nominated ambassador to Bosnia and Herzegovina, presenting his letter of credence on 20 August 2018.

Lindenberg is married to Aleksandra Emilia Lindenberg, with three children. He is brother to Grzegorz Lindenberg. In his youth, he was close friend to Jacek Kaczmarski.

Besides Polish, he speaks English, French, Russian, Bulgarian and Serbo-Croatian.

Honours
Commander of the Order of the Three Stars (1996)
Decoration of Honor Meritorious for Polish Culture (2001)
Order of the Balkan Mountains (2004)
Cross of Freedom and Solidarity (2012)

Works

See also
List of ambassadors of Poland
Bulgaria–Poland relations
Latvia–Poland relations

References

External links

1956 births
20th-century Polish philosophers
Ambassadors of Poland to Bosnia and Herzegovina
Ambassadors of Poland to Bulgaria
Ambassadors of Poland to Latvia
Ambassadors of Poland to Montenegro
Living people
Diplomats from Warsaw
Polish dissidents
Recipients of Cross of Freedom and Solidarity
Recipients of the Decoration of Honor Meritorious for Polish Culture
University of Warsaw alumni
Academic staff of the University of Warsaw